Feroge or Feroghe may refer to:

 Feroge people, an ethnic group of South Sudan
 Feroge language, their language

Language and nationality disambiguation pages